The Nashville Vols were a Minor League Baseball team that played in Nashville, Tennessee, from 1901 to 1963. They were established as charter members of the newly organized Southern Association in 1901. Known as the Nashville Baseball Club for their first seven seasons, the team did not receive their official moniker, the Nashville Volunteers, until 1908. However, the team was, and is, commonly referred to as the Vols. Their final season in the Southern Association was 1961. After sitting out the 1962 season, Nashville returned for a final campaign as a part of the South Atlantic League in 1963.

Over the Vols' 62 seasons of play, its pitchers pitched seven no-hitters, which includes one perfect game. A no-hit game occurs when a pitcher (or pitchers) allows no hits over the course of a game. A perfect game, a much rarer feat, occurs when no batters reach base by a hit or any other means, such as a walk, hit by pitch, or error. The feats were accomplished by a total of seven different pitchers. Four occurred at Nashville's home ballpark, Athletic Park, better known as Sulphur Dell from 1908. Three were pitched in road games. Six occurred while the team was a member of the Southern Association and one as a member of the South Atlantic League.

The team's first no-hitter was Bill Dammann's 8–0 win over the Shreveport Giants at Nashville's Athletic Park on July 9, 1902, in a rain-shortened 5-inning game. The second was thrown by John Duggan on September 10, 1908. The third was pitched by Charlie Case on August 31, 1909. On July 11, 1916, Tom Rogers pitched the first and only perfect game in team history. In all, Rogers struck out 4 of the 27 Chattanooga Lookouts batters he faced. The fifth no-hitter was pitched by Zeke Lohman on July 25, 1920. The sixth occurred nearly 30 years later on July 21, 1951, when Umberto Flammini fired a no-hitter against the Atlanta Crackers. The seventh and final no-hit game was Edward Kikla's gem on July 17, 1963.

No-hitters

References
Specific

General

No-hitters
Nashville Vols no-hitters